Teddy Thompson (born 19 February 1976) is an English folk and rock musician. He is the son of folk rock musicians Richard and Linda Thompson and brother of singer Kamila Thompson. He released his first album in 2000.

Biography
Teddy Thompson was born in 1976 in a London Sufi commune to folk rock musicians Richard and Linda Thompson, both major musical figures in the English folk rock scene from the 1960s onward. He formed a band at the age of 18. He moved to Los Angeles to pursue his music career, which included work as a singer and guitar player in his father Richard's band during the 1990s. He appears on at least three Richard Thompson Band recordings from that time: You? Me? Us?, the live album Celtschmerz (1998) and Mock Tudor (1999), as well as singing a duet on the track "Persuasion", which appeared on Richard's best-of compilation Action Packed (1999). He can be seen performing in his father's band on a number of internet videos from as early as 1993, including an appearance on Jools Holland's show. He coaxed his mother out of retirement and co-produced her first album in 17 years, titled Fashionably Late.

Discography

Albums

EPs, etc.

LA (EP) (2001)
Blunderbuss (EP) (2004)

Singles
 "Everybody Move It" (2005)
 "In My Arms" (2008) – (UK #107)
 "Christmas" (2008) – featuring special guests Linda, Richard, and Kamila Thompson
 "Looking for a Girl" (2011)

Guest appearances
 1996 – Richard Thompson's You? Me? Us? – "Bank Vault in Heaven" – vocals
 1998 – Richard Thompson's Celtschmerz – "A Heart Needs a Home", "Persuasion" – vocals
 1999 – Richard Thompson's Mock Tudor – guitar, backing vocals, harmony vocals
 2001 – Richard Thompson Action Packed – "Persuasion" – live duet
 2002 – Rufus Wainwright's Poses – "One Man Guy"- guitar, harmony vocals
 2002 – Richard Thompson's Semi-Detached Mock Tudor – dulcimer, guitar, vocals
 2002 – Linda Thompson's Fashionably Late – co-writer and guest vocals
 2003 – Rosanne Cash's Rules of Travel – "Three Steps Down" – vocals
 2005 – Kate & Anna McGarrigle's The McGarrigle Christmas Hour – vocals
 2006 – Shawn Colvin's These Four Walls – "Let it Slide" – vocals
 2007 – Linda Thompson's Versatile Heart – co-writer and guest vocals
 2007 – Rufus Wainwright's Release the Stars – "Tiergarten" – backing vocals
 2008 – Jason Crigler's The Music of Jason Crigler – "Through Tomorrow", "Dixie" – vocals
 2008 – Marianne Faithfull's Easy Come, Easy Go – "How Many Worlds" – vocals

Compilation/soundtrack contributions
 1998 – Psycho – "Psycho"
 2002 – Shining Bright: Songs Of Lal & Mike Waterson, various artists – joint vocals (with Linda Thompson) on Evona Darling
 2006 – Brokeback Mountain – "I Don't Want to Say Goodbye", co-lead "King of the Road" (with Rufus Wainwright)
 2006 – Q Covered: The Eighties – "Don't Dream It's Over"
 2006 – Leonard Cohen: I'm Your Man – "The Future", "Tonight Will Be Fine"
 2006 – Rogue's Gallery: Pirate Ballads, Sea Songs, and Chanteys – "Sally Brown"
 2013 – Sing Me the Songs: Celebrating the Works of Kate McGarrigle – "Saratoga Summer Song"

Video
Teddy Thompson Performs on the BPP (live performance on The Bryant Park Project)

References

External links

1976 births
Living people
British folk rock musicians
English folk singers
English rock guitarists
English male singer-songwriters
People educated at Bedales School
English male guitarists
20th-century British male singers
21st-century British male singers
20th-century English singers
20th-century British guitarists
21st-century English singers
21st-century British guitarists